Wilhelm Löffler may refer to:

 Wilhelm Löffler (doctor) (1887–1972), Swiss doctor
 Wilhelm Löffler (fencer) (1886–?), German Olympic fencer